Back Creek Presbyterian Church and Cemetery is a historic Presbyterian church and cemetery in Mount Ulla Township, Rowan County, North Carolina currently affiliated with the Presbyterian Church in America (PCA).  It was named for a nearby stream, which was back of Sills Creek and called Back Creek.

History
In the late 18th century disagreements about the worship style at Thyatira Presbyterian Church culminated in the splitting of its congregation. Thirty families, including all five of Thyatira elders - Thomas King, John Barr, William Bell, Abraham Lowrance, and Thomas Gillespie, Jr. (son of Thomas Gillespie, Sr.) - left the church. They worshipped without a pastor for several years until their request to form a new church was granted by Concord Presbytery. The official birth date of the Church of Back Creek was September 5, 1805.

In 1807 the first pastor, Rev. Joseph D.Kirkpatrick of Poplar Tent Presbytery, accepted the call to lead the new congregation. Four year later the congregation built a little log house of worship on the land donated by John Barr, one of the ruling elders.  This was replaced by the congregations present Greek Revival sanctuary built in 1857. In 1869 the congregation lost their African-American members, nearly half of the congregation. The entire region suffered economic depression. Many members left to the West. In 1952 a religious educational building was added. The current manse was built in 1968.  Over the years Back Creek Presbyterian belonged to five different Presbyterian denomination. In 1991 the congregation joined the Presbyterian Church in America. In 1993 classrooms and kitchen were expanded.

In 1824 some members of Back Creek Church congregation organized Prospect Presbyterian Church in southwestern corner of Rowan County.

The Rev. S. C. Alexander (1830–1907) delivered the dedication of the third church building in an  address  at Thyatira on October 17, 1855.  At that time, he was pastor of the church.

It was added to the National Register of Historic Places in 1983.

Back Creek adheres to the Westminster Confession of Faith, Westminster Larger Catechism and Westminster Shorter Catechism.

See also
 South Yadkin River showing Back Creek

References

External links
Official website

Presbyterian Church in America churches in North Carolina
Cemeteries in North Carolina
Protestant Reformed cemeteries
Churches on the National Register of Historic Places in North Carolina
Greek Revival church buildings in North Carolina
Churches completed in 1856
19th-century Presbyterian church buildings in the United States
Churches in Rowan County, North Carolina
National Register of Historic Places in Rowan County, North Carolina